Andarik (also Romanized as Andarīk, Anderīk, and Andark) is a village in Qaen Rural District, in the Central District of Qaen County, South Khorasan Province, Iran. At the 2006 census, its population was 510, in 147 families.

References 

Populated places in Qaen County